Heterocithara sibogae is a species of sea snail, a marine gastropod mollusk in the family Mangeliidae.

Description

Distribution
This marine species occurs off Indonesia.

References

 Shuto, Tsugio. "Taxonomical notes on the turrids of the Siboga-Collection originally described by MN Schepman, 1913 (Part 3)." Venus 28.4 (1970): 161–178.

External links
  Tucker, J.K. 2004 Catalog of recent and fossil turrids (Mollusca: Gastropoda). Zootaxa 682:1–1295.

sibogae
Gastropods described in 1970